William Hare, 3rd Earl of Listowel KP JP (29 May 1833 – 5 June 1924), styled Viscount Ennismore from 1837 to 1856, was an Anglo-Irish peer and Liberal politician.

Background
Listowel was the eldest son of William Hare, 2nd Earl of Listowel, and Maria Augusta, widow of George Wyndham of Cromer Hall, Norfolk, and second daughter of Vice-Admiral of William Windham (formerly Lukin of Felbrigge Hall). He was educated at Eton before gaining a commission as a lieutenant in the Scots Fusiliers Guards.

Military career
He served with his regiment during the Crimean War (1854-6). At the Battle of Alma he was wounded on 30 September 1854, and was invalided out to England by ship.

Political career
In the 1855 general election he stood for the Liberal party in County Cork.  He succeeded his father in the earldom in 1856 but as this was an Irish peerage it did not entitle him to a seat in the House of Lords. On 8 December 1869 he was created Baron Hare, of Convamore in the County of Cork, in the Peerage of the United Kingdom, which gave him the immediate right to sit in the House of Lords. In 1873 he was appointed to Knight of the Order of St Patrick.

Lord Listowel later served as a Lord-in-waiting (government whip in the House of Lords) from May to September 1880, this was at the beginning of the second Liberal administration of William Ewart Gladstone, but was informed that the royal household was not an hereditary sinecure. However he was appointed to the largely ceremonial post of Vice-admiral of Munster.

Family
Lord Listowel married Lady Ernestine Mary, younger daughter of Ernest Brudenell-Bruce, 3rd Marquess of Ailesbury, in 1865. He died in June 1924, aged 91, and was succeeded in his titles by his eldest son Richard. Two of his grandsons, William Hare, 5th Earl of Listowel, and John Hare, 1st Viscount Blakenham, both became government ministers. Lady Listowel died in 1936.

Richard Granville, 4th Earl of Listowel
Charles Ambrose (1875–1885)
Margaret Ernestine Augusta (d.1951) married Reginald Loder
Beatrice Mary (d.1960) married Hon Edward O'Brien (d.1943), youngest son of 14th Baron Inchiquin

References

Bibliography

Charles Mosley (ed.), Burke's Peerage and Baronetage, (106th edition, 1999), vol.1, p. 1735.

External links

1833 births
1924 deaths
People educated at Eton College
Irish justices of the peace
Knights of St Patrick
Liberal Party (UK) Lords-in-Waiting
3
William
Peers of the United Kingdom created by Queen Victoria
Scots Guards officers
British Army personnel of the Crimean War
Barons in the Peerage of the United Kingdom